A carousel is an amusement ride.

Carousel or carrousel may also refer to:

Arts, entertainment, and media

Stage productions
 Carousel (ballet) or Carousel (A Dance), a ballet by Christopher Wheeldon
 Carousel (musical), a 1945 Rodgers and Hammerstein musical
 Carousel (comics),  a multimedia comics slide show by Robert Sikoryak

Films
 Carousel (1923 film), a Swedish film by Dimitri Buchowetzki 
 Carousel (1937 film), a German film starring Marika Röck
 Carousel (film), a 1956 film by Henry King adapted from the 1945 Rodgers and Hammerstein stage musical
 Carousel (1967 film), a made-for-television film adapted from the 1945 Rodgers and Hammerstein stage musical

Music

Groups
 Carousel (band), represented Latvia at Eurovision 2019
 Carrousel (band), a French-Swiss band that tried to represent Switzerland at Eurovision 2013

Albums
 Carousel (Leila K album) (1993)
 Carousel (Will Hoge album) (2001)
 Carousel (Wizex album) (1978)
Carousel (Marcia Griffiths album), 1990
 Carousel, a 1996 album by Subcircus
 Carrousel (album), a 1988 album by Enanitos Verdes

Songs
 "Carousel" (Blink-182 song) (1994)
 "Carousel" (Linkin Park song) (1999)
 "Carousel" (Melanie Martinez song) (2014)
 "Carousel" (Vanessa Carlton song) (2011)
 "Carousel" or "La valse à mille temps", by Jacques Brel
 "Carousel", by Michael Jackson from the Thriller 2001 special edition album
 ”Carousel” by 5 Seconds Of Summer from 5SOS5
 "Carousel", by Vibe Tribe from Wise Cracks
 "Carousel", by Travis Scott from Astroworld
 "Carousel", by Flobots from Noenemies
 "Carousel", by Iron & Wine from The Shepherd's Dog

Television
 Carousel (TV channel), a Russian television channel
 "Carousel", an episode of the television series Teletubbies

Other arts, entertainment, and media
 Carousel (advertisement), a 2009 advertisement for Philips LCD televisions
 Carrousel (booklet), three short texts written by Vladimir Nabokov
 Carrousel, a fictional ritual in Logan's Run
 Carousel (Sea World), a ride at Nickelodeon Land, Gold Coast, Australia

Technology
 Baggage carousel, a device for delivering passengers' luggage
 Carousel slide projector, a slideshow projector with a rotary tray
 Data and object carousel, a round-robin broadcast transmission scheme

Other uses
 Caracciola Karussell or The Carousel, a banked corner section of the Nürburgring race track
 Carousel Buses, a bus company in High Wycombe, England
 Carousel Mall, a shopping mall in San Bernardino, California
 Carousel Shopping Center, a shopping mall in Istanbul, Turkey
 Maki Carrousel (born 1942), Japanese actor
 Westfield Carousel, a shopping centre in Cannington, Western Australia
 Carousel fraud, a type of missing trader fraud
 Carousel voting, a method of vote rigging
 Rambler Carrousel, a show car by American Motors Corporation

See also
 Carousel Theater (disambiguation)
 Carousell (disambiguation)
Carrusel, a Mexican telenovela
Carrossel, the Brazilian remake
Carrossel (album), by Skank (2006)
 Merry-Go-Round (disambiguation)